The 1991 Volta a Catalunya was the 71st edition of the Volta a Catalunya cycle race and was held from 6 September to 12 September 1991. The race started in Manresa and finished in Tortosa. The race was won by Miguel Induráin of the Banesto team.

General classification

References

1991
Volta
1991 in Spanish road cycling
September 1991 sports events in Europe